Once More with Feeling: Singles 1996–2004 is a greatest hits album by British alternative rock band Placebo. It was released on 30 November 2004 by record label Hut to celebrate the band's tenth anniversary. It features their singles from 1996 to 2004 (the only omission being the band's debut single, "Come Home") as well as three new songs: "I Do", "Twenty Years", and "Protège-Moi", the last two of which were released as singles. The album is also available in DVD format, titled Once More with Feeling: Videos 1996–2004, featuring all of the band's music videos.

Release history 

The limited edition of the album included a bonus remix disc featuring remixes by artists such as Timo Maas, UNKLE, and M83. There is also a limited edition bonus disc exclusive to the Mexican market which features remixes by Mexican artists.

This album has been released with the Copy Control protection system in some regions.

Track listing

Once More with Feeling: Videos 1996–2004 

Once More with Feeling: Videos 1996–2004 was released in 2004 and features the band's music videos.

Track listing

Charts

Weekly charts

Year-end charts

Certifications

Production credits 

 Jim Abbiss – production (tracks 1-13–1-17), mixing (tracks 1-13–1-15)
 Philip Bagenal – engineering (tracks 1-18–1-19)
 Simon Barnicott – engineering (tracks 1-13–1-17), mixing (tracks 1-13–1-15)
 David Bascombe – mixing (tracks 1-3 and 1-8)
 Andy Bolleshon – additional production (track 2-1)
 James Brown – engineering assisting (track 1-16)
 Adrian Bushby – engineering (tracks 1-6–1-8)
 Martin Buttrich – additional production (track 2-1)
 Paul Corkett – engineering (track 1-9), additional engineering (track 1-6), mixing and production (tracks 1-9–1-12)
 Alex Cowper – sleeve art direction and design
 Jake Davies – engineering assisting (track 1-6)

 Lorraine Francis – engineering (tracks 1-9–1-12)
 Nick Hunt – engineering (track 1-19)
 Nadav Kander – sleeve photography 
 Phelan Kane – programming (tracks 1-18–1-19)
 Ed Kenehan – engineering (tracks 1-1, 1-3–1-4)
 Timo Maas – additional production (track 2-1)
 Andy Mason – production (track 1-9)
 Sean Magee – mastering and remastering (tracks 1-1–1-19)
 Teo Miller – engineering (tracks 1-3–1-4), additional recording and mixing (track 1-7)
 Alan O'Connell – engineering assisting (tracks 1-18–1-19)
 Steve Osborne – production (tracks 1-6–1-8), mixing (track 1-6)
 Gareth Parton – engineering (track 1-18)
 Tom Paterson – engineering assisting (tracks 1-18–1-19)

 Kenny Patterson – engineering (track 1-9)
 Fergus Peterkin – engineering assisting (tracks 1-13–1-15)
 Dan Porter – engineering assisting (tracks 1-13–1-15)
 Junior Sanchez – additional production (track 2-10)
 Tom Stanley – engineering assisting (tracks 1-13–1-15)
 Dimitri Tikovoi – mixing (tracks 1-16–1-17)
 Jaquie Turner – engineering assisting (track 1-6)
 Orla Quirke – sleeve art direction
 Phil Vinall – production (tracks 1-3, 1-5, 1-18–1-19), mixing (tracks 1-5, 1-18–1-19)
 Tony Visconti – additional mixing and additional recording (track 1-8)
 Brad Wood – mixing and production (tracks 1-1–1-2, and 1-4)

References

External links 

 

2004 greatest hits albums
Placebo (band) albums
2004 remix albums
Astralwerks remix albums
Astralwerks compilation albums